Dimitrios Kyteas (Greek: Δημήτριος Κυτέας, born 21 November 1954) is a retired Physical Education Professor and active Federal Coach. For many years he was Greek National and Balkan Champion in Pole Vault. He participated in European Championships, International Meetings and in Montreal Olympic Games as athlete and in London and Rio de Janeiro as coach.

He studied in the National and Kapodistrian University of Athens and became Physical Education Professor, specialized in jumps. For many years till now is a Federal Coach of the Greek National Team in Pole Vault with productive work on athletes of all ages.

He is the first Junior in the Balkans clearing 5.00 m. and his personal best is 5.32m. Dimitirios Kyteas became an Olympian.

Athletic career 
Dimitrios Kyteas was an athlete in Panathinaikos Athletic Club.

He is the first Junior in the Balkans clearing 5.00 m. and his personal best is 5.32m since 1975. Dimitirios Kyteas became an Olympian with his participation in Montreal Olympic Games in 1976. His achievements are:

- National Youth Record (4.12m. - 1970)

- National and Balkan U-18 Record (4.92m. - 1972)

- National and Balkan U-18 Record (5.00m. - 1973)

- 1st place in National Games (4 times - 1976, 1980, 1981, 1982)

- 5th place in U-18 European Championships (Duisburg - 1973)

- 1st place in U-18 Balkan Games (Bucharest - 1973)

- 1st place in Balkan Games (Bucharest - 1975)

- 1st place in Balkan Games (Yugoslavia - 1976)

- 7th place in European Championships (Munich - 1976)

- Participation in Olympic Games (Montreal - 1976)

- 2nd place in Universiade (Turin - 1978)

- 1st place in Balkan Games (Bucharest - 1982)

- 3rd place in Balkan Games (Ankara - 1977)

- 3rd place in Balkan Games (Athens - 1979)

- 3rd place in Balkan Games (Sarajevo - 1981)

- 3rd place in Balkan Games (Izmir - 1983)

- Participation in Universiade (Sofia - 1977 /10th), (Mexico - 1979 /10th), (Bucharest - 1981 /9th)

- Participation in Mediterranean Games (Split - 1979 /4th), (Casablanca - 1983).

Coaching 
His best achievement and characteristic success was when his athlete Konstantinos Filippidis won the Gold Medal in World Indoor Championship in Ergo Arena 2014.

References

External links
 
 SEGAS - All time outdoor top 20 athletes
 SEGAS - Dimitrios Kyteas personal best
 Panathinaikos A.C - Ceremonials Honorary
 StivoZ.gr - Classic Sports seminar
 Hellenic Olympians Association - Dimitrios Kyteas CV
 IAAF - Athlete Profile
 The Golden Bible of Sports: 117 years Greek Classic Sports 1896 - 2012.

1954 births
Living people
Athletes (track and field) at the 1976 Summer Olympics
Greek male pole vaulters
Olympic athletes of Greece
Place of birth missing (living people)
Athletes from Athens
20th-century Greek people